Dineh Sar-e Rakan Kola (also Romanized as Dīneh Sar-e Rakan Kolā; also known as Dīneh Sar) is a village in Kiakola Rural District, in the Central District of Simorgh County, Mazandaran Province, Iran. At the 2006 census, its population was 298, in 75 families.

References 

Populated places in Simorgh County